Men's synchronized 10 metre platform event at the 2019 European Diving Championships was contested on 8 August.

Results
Six pairs of athletes participated at the single-round event.

References

M